Micaela Aguilar González (born 29 September 1955) is a Mexican politician affiliated with the National Action Party. As of 2014 she served as Senator of the LVIII and LIX Legislatures of the Mexican Congress representing the State of Mexico.

References

1951 births
Living people
Politicians from the State of Mexico
Women members of the Senate of the Republic (Mexico)
Members of the Senate of the Republic (Mexico)
National Action Party (Mexico) politicians
21st-century Mexican politicians
21st-century Mexican women politicians